Lisinsky is a rural locality (a khutor) in Sulyayevskoye Rural Settlement, Kumylzhensky District, Volgograd Oblast, Russia. The population was 22 as of 2010.

Geography 
Lisinsky is located in forest steppe, on Khopyorsko-Buzulukskaya Plain, on the bank of the Kumylga River, 23 km north of Kumylzhenskaya (the district's administrative centre) by road. Tyurinsky is the nearest rural locality.

References 

Rural localities in Kumylzhensky District